The Women's relay competition at the 2017 World Championships was held on 17 February 2017.

Results
The race was started at 14:45.

References

Women's relay
2017 in Austrian women's sport
Biath